Liam David Grimshaw (born 2 February 1995) is an English professional footballer who plays as a right-back, or as a midfielder, for Greenock Morton.

Club career

Manchester United
Grimshaw joined United at schoolboy level, and later in his career went on to make his debut for the Manchester United Academy against city rivals Manchester City. During the 2012–13 season, Grimshaw was a regular in the side, notching up a total of 28 appearances and eventually forcing his way into the Manchester United reserve side during the latter stages of that campaign. Also, Grimshaw was appointed as Academy team captain, which he was to take on regularly. His eye-catching form led to Paul McGuinness, manager of the under-18's team, comparing Grimshaw with the likes of John O'Shea and Phil Neville, both of whom progressed through the youth ranks at Old Trafford.

Motherwell (loan)
Grimshaw's first taste of first-team action as a professional was with Scottish club Motherwell, whom he joined for the 2015–16 season. He made his debut for the Steelmen from the bench in a 1–1 draw at home against Ross County. In January 2016, Grimshaw was recalled from his loan at Motherwell shortly before it was due to expire.

Preston North End
On 18 January 2016, Grimshaw joined Preston North End for an undisclosed fee, signing a two-and-a-half-year contract. He was released from his contract in August 2017.

Chesterfield (loan)
On 31 January 2017, Grimshaw joined Chesterfield on loan until the end of the season. He made his debut for the club on 4 February against Oldham Athletic.

Motherwell
Grimshaw returned to Motherwell on a permanent basis in August 2017. On 16 May 2018, Grimshaw signed a new one-year contract with Motherwell. On 12 March 2019, he signed a further one-year contract keeping him at the club until 2020. Grimshaw scored his first career goal on 21 August 2021, as Motherwell won 2–1 away to Livingston. On 15 January 2020, Grimshaw signed another new contract at Motherwell, keeping him at the club until the summer of 2022. On 20 May 2022, Motherwell announced that Grimshaw would leave the club upon the expiration of his contract on 31 May 2022.

Greenock Morton
Scottish Championship club Greenock Morton signed Grimshaw to a short-term contract in September 2022. His contract was extended in December 2022 until the end of the season following a series of impressive performances.

International career
Grimshaw's form during the 2012–13 season also saw him make his first appearance for the England Under-18s against Italy.

Career statistics

References

External links
Profile at ManUtd.com
Profile at TheFA.com

1995 births
Living people
Footballers from Burnley
English footballers
England youth international footballers
Association football midfielders
Manchester United F.C. players
Morecambe F.C. players
Motherwell F.C. players
Scottish Professional Football League players
Preston North End F.C. players
Chesterfield F.C. players
English Football League players
Greenock Morton F.C. players